The Gloster River is a river in the Marlborough region of New Zealand. It arises on the northern slope of Dillon Cone in the Inland Kaikōura Range and flows north, then south-east and east to join the Waiau Toa / Clarence River which eventually exits into the Pacific Ocean.

In 1888, the Gloster River formed a boundary between the counties of Marlborough and Kaikoura.

See also
List of rivers of New Zealand

References

Land Information New Zealand - Search for Place Names

Rivers of the Marlborough Region
Rivers of New Zealand